Thomas Sanders (born April 24, 1989) is an American singer, actor, scriptwriter and internet personality made famous by Vine and YouTube. He is best known for his YouTube channel and Vine career, which lasted from April 2013 until the social media site was shut down by Twitter in 2017. After the shutdown of Vine, he continued releasing videos across various social media sites. Sanders creates long videos on YouTube, while simultaneously posting shorter videos in the style of Vine to Instagram, Tumblr, TikTok and Twitter. His work consists of comedy sketches, pranks, stories, singing and civil rights activism.

Sanders is mainly known for the Vine series Narrating People's Lives, also known as Storytime, for the prank series “Disney Pranks with friends,” and on YouTube for the series Sanders Sides. He reached over 7.4 billion loops and 8.3 million followers on Vine, making his career one of the most successful in this social media platform's short history. As of 2020, his account on TikTok has a following of 7 million followers. On YouTube, he has two channels, "Thomas Sanders" and "Thomas Sanders and Friends". As of November 2020, his main channel has 3.49 million subscribers and his second channel has around 376,000 subscribers. Sanders has won two Shorty Awards and one Streamy Award, for best Viner and best YouTube comedian, and has been nominated for a Teen Choice Award to "Choice Viner" among other recognitions.

As a singer, Sanders has published one EP in 2013, one album in 2016, and several singles from 2017 onwards. He has had a career in musical theatre in his hometown in Florida since he was a teenager, performing since 2006 in Gainesville and Orlando, Florida, and starring in a tour through 17 cities in the USA and Canada with his own stage musical, Ultimate Storytime, based on his Vine series. In 2017, he made a guest appearance on the Disney Channel show Bizaardvark and co-hosted a special episode of the Disney XD show Walk the Prank alongside David Lopez.<ref name="walkPrank">{{cite episode|url=http://watchdisneyxd.go.com/walk-the-prank/video/vdka3740982/01/101-talk-the-prank-with-thomas-sanders-and-david-lopez?rfr=fanhattan|series=Walk the Prank|title=Talk the Prank with Thomas Sanders and David Lopez|season=1|number=21|date=March 20, 2017|access-date=November 16, 2017}} (accessible from the USA only).</ref>

Personal life
Sanders was born and raised in Gainesville, Florida and currently still lives there. His great-grandfather on his mother's side was born in Ireland. His great-grandmother was a Ziegfeld Follies girl, something Sanders called his "ancestral connection with stage". Sanders' father is a teacher. Sanders has three brothers named Patrick, Christian, and Shea. He started singing in public and took his first steps in acting in middle-school at Kanapaha Middle School, located in Gainesville, singing in several choruses and appearing in several school plays. In his high-school, Buchholz, he started combining acting and singing by doing his first roles in musical plays. Later, Sanders combined his studies at the University of Florida with community theater, joining the Gainesville Community Playhouse from 2006 until 2015. When he graduated with a Bachelor of Science in chemical engineering in 2011, he subsequently combined his daytime job as a manufacturing engineer at a pharmaceutical development company in Alachua with his night-time job in theater, until his success on Vine prompted him to leave that first job and focus on Vine and theater. In June 2017, he publicly came out as gay.

 Career 

 Vine and Sanders Shorts
Thomas Sanders made his debut on Vine as "Foster Dawg", named after his first dog, Foster, on April 14, 2013. An impression of Stewie Griffin from Family Guy in a drive-thru was his first Vine to go viral, leading to continued success on the app. He later rebranded his channel to "Thomas Sanders". His channel reached 1 million followers on Vine in October 2013. His biggest success on Vine was the Narrating People's Lives series, also known as Storytime, where he approached random strangers, comically narrated everyday activities they were doing, and showed their reaction. Other Vine series he is known for are Disney Pranks with Friends, Pokémon Pranks, Misleading Compliments, and Shoutout Sunday, among others. By April 2015, Sanders' Vine account had over 5 million followers, which made Thomas Sanders the 17th most followed Viner at the time.

When Twitter announced that it was closing Vine down at the end of 2016, Sanders announced that he would continue making Vines until the app's last day. When Vine was shut down on January 17, 2017, Sanders had reached 8.3 million followers. Since that date, his short videos, now known as the Sanders Shorts, are first released on his Instagram, where as of November 2018 he has 2.5 million followers.

On February 24, 2015, Sanders appeared as a guest on The View in a segment featuring Vine stars, where he was interviewed about his popularity on Vine, and one of his Vines was featured on The Ellen DeGeneres Show in their section Vine after Vine. Sanders has collaborated with Viners such as Vincent Marcus, Brandon Calvillo and Amymarie Gaertner, and featured cameos and appearances from figures such as Sean Bean, Nicolle Wallace, Stacy London, Nick Pitera (with whom he did a series of Vines, Unexpected Duets), Brizzy Voices, Gabbie Hanna, Tara Strong, E. G. Daily, Jim Cummings, Dan and Phil, Adam Pascal and the main actors from Hamilton, Teen Titans Go! and Steven Universe, among others.

 YouTube 
Sanders opened his official YouTube account on March 15, 2009. After amassing a following through Vine, he started publishing more frequently through YouTube. He had his first YouTube collaborations throughout 2015, consisting of pranks, games and challenges. Up until 2014, his subscriber count grew at a lower rate, with around 80,000 subscribers at the end of that year. From that date, his user count growth started progressively accelerating, having 200,000 subscribers by April 2015 and more than 700,000 subscribers at the end of 2015.

From the second half of 2016, at the same time his Vine activity slowed following Twitter's announcement of Vine's forthcoming closedown, Sanders announced he would be focusing on his YouTube content from then on in order to create more diversely formatted content. As of October 2021, his channel has 3.49 million subscribers.

On October 29, 2018, he debuted a second YouTube channel called "Thomas Sanders & Friends", which would be dedicated to the monthly Sanders Shorts compilations and the unscripted, guest-oriented shows he had done previously on his main channel. The main channel would thereafter be dedicated exclusively to scripted series and shows as well as his music videoclips. His second channel has 396,000 subscribers as of August 2021.

 Sanders Sides 

Since October 19, 2016, Thomas Sanders has run a YouTube web series called Sanders Sides, co-written with Joan S., in which he discusses personal or existential issues with four main characters, collectively known as the titular "Sanders Sides". Sanders Sides consists of two seasons with a total as of May 2020 of 30 episodes released on a variable periodicity. Season 1 has 17 episodes released from October 19, 2016, to July 19, 2017. Season 2 began on September 1, 2017, and as of May 2020, it has 13 episodes. It is a spin-off from the Vine/Sanders Shorts series, as Patton, Roman and Logan are inspired by characters that had previously debuted on Vine in 2014, the Dad Guy, the Prince Guy, and the Teacher Guy respectively. The Sanders Sides are usually all portrayed by Sanders himself. Sanders Sides has featured sometimes appearances of guest stars like Lilly Singh or Butch Hartman who, apart from appearing as himself, created an animated sequence exclusively for Sanders Sides where Thomas and his Sides became cartoon characters. Tara Strong, who had already appeared in several Vines and Sanders Shorts, also made a voice cameo in Hartman's episode. On November 22, 2019, a companion series titled Sanders Asides was premiered, featuring the Sides in lighter stories in shorter episodes designed, in Sanders' words, to feature stories not directly linked to the main narrative.

The Sanders Sides are "physical-mental projections" of Thomas' mind, and represent different aspects of Thomas' personality. Thomas usually starts each episode as an ordinary vlog about a certain topic or dilemma. The series is mostly comedic with some more dramatic elements.

 Theater 

Apart from his Internet-based career, Sanders has worked in musical theater at the Gainesville Community Playhouse for productions including Hot Mikado (2007), Singin' in the Rain (2009), The Producers (2010), Anything Goes (2011), Into the Woods (2014), and Les Misérables (2014). In 2015, Sanders did his first professional theater work starring in Heathers: The Musical as J.D. in a production performed in Orlando. From August 8 to September 2, 2016, Sanders went on a stage musical tour, Ultimate Storytime, written by him with songs composed by Jacob Fjeldheim, and based on his Vine series Narrating People's Lives, performing in 17 cities in the USA and Canada, including Toronto and New York City. In 2019, Sanders was cast as the understudy for The Beast in Beauty and the Beast In 2022, he joined Heathers The Musical in Concert, a benefit concert reunion of the 2015 Orlando cast of Heathers: The Musical, portraying again J.D., which earned him a nomination to Best Performer in a Musical in the 2022 BroadwayWorld Orlando Awards, as well as another nomination together with the rest of the cast to Best Ensemble Performance.

 Music 

Though critics often classified Sanders as a baritone, he considers himself a bass singer. He has sung primarily on Vine and YouTube. He has performed songs in a wide variety of genres but has personally showed a preference towards jazz music, mentioning Nat King Cole as one of his favorite singers. He has musically collaborated with dodie, Jon Cozart, Ben J. Pierce, Deedee Magno HallAdam Pascal, and AJ Rafael. He released his first EP, titled Merry Christmas, on Bandcamp on December 21, 2013; the EP consisted of Christmas songs. In 2016, he released the soundtrack of his Ultimate Storytime stage musical, recorded alongside his co-stars, Terrence Williams Jr., Nicole Visco, Jay Harper (also known as JayIsJo) and Leo Anderson (also known as Leo the Giant). On July 22, 2017, Sanders released on YouTube a new original song titled "The Things We Used to Share", inspired by real events in Sanders' life. It was followed by more singles in 2018 and the announcement of a new EP.

 EPs and albums Merry Christmas (EP) (2013)Ultimate Storytime'' (2016)

Songs and singles

Filmography

Awards and nominations

Notes

References

External links 

1989 births
Living people
American people of Irish descent
Vine (service) celebrities
American YouTubers
Comedy YouTubers
Music YouTubers
LGBT people from Florida
YouTubers who make LGBT-related content
Male actors from Gainesville, Florida
Singers from Florida
American male musical theatre actors
American basses
American gay musicians
American gay actors
American LGBT singers
University of Florida alumni
20th-century LGBT people
21st-century LGBT people
LGBT YouTubers
Gay singers